The Skreia Line is an abandoned railway line between Reinsvoll and Skreia in Toten, Norway.  The 21.97 kilometer long single track rail was a branch line from the Gjøvik Line.

History 
The line was opened on 26 November 1902.  All the stations and depots were drawn by Paul Due, who used a number of different styles, including Art Nouveau for Lena and Kraby while Skreia was in Dragestil. Originally the idea was that Gjøvikbanen would follow part of the route of Skreiabanen, but this was changed because of major industrial interests in Raufoss and Hunndalen.  Passenger traffic was terminated in 1963 while freight traffic continued until 1987.

Rail trail 

In the mid 1990s the track was removed and converted to a Rail trail for pedestrian and bicycle traffic.

Railway lines in Norway
Railway lines in Oppland
Railway lines opened in 1902
1902 establishments in Norway
Closed railway lines in Norway